"Who Do You Know in California" is a song written and recorded by American country music artist Eddy Raven.  It was released in October 1981 as the second single from the album Desperate Dreams.  The song reached #11 on the Billboard Hot Country Singles & Tracks chart.

Content
The song is about a marital affair with a woman in California which is unveiled when the mistress in the situation calls the narrator's wife, after which the wife questions the narrator with the song's title. No resolution is given to the song's question. According to Raven, he originally wanted to title the song "Who Do You Know in Dallas", but he felt that "California" fit the song's meter better.

Chart performance

References

Songs about California
1982 singles
1981 songs
Eddy Raven songs
Songs written by Eddy Raven
Song recordings produced by Jimmy Bowen
Elektra Records singles
Songs about telephone calls